Pio Nono may refer to:

People
 Pope Pius IX

Educational institutions
 Pio Nono College (Georgia) a former college (1876-1920) in Macon, Georgia
 Pio Nono College (Wisconsin) a former college in St. Francis, Wisconsin
 Pio Nono High School, the former secondary school component of the college in Wisconsin

Other
 Pionono, a sweet pastry